The Princess and the Goblin is a children's fantasy novel by George MacDonald. It was published in 1872 by Strahan & Co., with black-and-white illustrations by Arthur Hughes. Strahan had published the story and illustrations as a serial in the monthly magazine Good Words for the Young, beginning November 1870.

Anne Thaxter Eaton writes in A Critical History of Children's Literature that The Princess and the Goblin and its sequel "quietly suggest in every incident ideas of courage and honor." Jeffrey Holdaway, in the New Zealand Art Monthly, said that both books start out as "normal fairytales but slowly become stranger", and that they contain layers of symbolism similar to that of Lewis Carroll's work.

Summary
Eight-year-old Princess Irene lives a lonely life in a castle in a wild, desolate, mountainous kingdom, with only her nursemaid, Lootie, for company. Her father, the king, is normally absent, and her mother is dead. Unknown to her, the nearby mines are inhabited by a race of goblins, long banished from the kingdom and now anxious to take revenge on their human neighbours. One rainy day, the princess explores the castle and discovers a beautiful, mysterious lady, who identifies herself as Irene's namesake and great-great-grandmother. The next day, Princess Irene persuades her nursemaid to take her outside. After dark they are chased by goblins and rescued by a young miner, Curdie, whom Irene befriends. At work with the rest of the miners, Curdie overhears the goblins talking, and their conversation reveals to Curdie the secret weakness of goblin anatomy: they have very soft, vulnerable feet. Curdie sneaks into the Great Hall of the goblin palace to eavesdrop on their general meeting, and hears that the goblins intend to flood the mine if a certain other part of their plan should fail. He later conveys this news to his father. In the palace, Princess Irene injures her hand, which her great-great-grandmother heals. A week later Irene is about to see her great-great-grandmother again, but is frightened by a long-legged cat and escapes up the mountain; whereupon the light from her great-great-grandmother's tower leads her home, where her great-great-grandmother gives Irene a ring attached to a thread invisible except to herself, which thereafter connects her constantly to home.

When Curdie explores the goblins' domain, he is discovered by the goblins and stamps on their feet with great success; but when he tries to stamp on the Queen's feet she is uninjured due to her stone shoes. The goblins imprison Curdie, thinking he will die of starvation; but Irene's magic thread leads her to his rescue, and Curdie steals one of the goblin queen's stone shoes. Irene takes Curdie to see her great-great-grandmother and be introduced, but she is visible only to Irene. Curdie later learns that the goblins are digging a tunnel in the mines towards the king's palace, where they plan to abduct the Princess and marry her to goblin prince Harelip. Curdie warns the palace guards about this, but is imprisoned instead and contracts a fever through a wound in his leg, until Irene's great-great-grandmother heals the wound. Meanwhile, the goblins break through the palace floor and come to abduct the princess, but Curdie escapes from his prison room and stamps on the goblins' feet. Upon the goblins' retreat, Irene is believed a captive, but Curdie follows the magic thread to her refuge at his own house, and restores her to the king. When the goblins flood the mines, the water enters the palace, and Curdie warns the others; the goblins subsequently drown. The king asks him to serve as a bodyguard; but Curdie refuses, saying he cannot leave his mother and father, and instead accepts a new red petticoat for his mother, as a reward.

Film adaptations
In the 1960s, the novel was adapted in animated form by Jay Ward for his Fractured Fairy Tales series. This version involved a race of innocent goblins who are forced to live underground. The ugly goblin  king falls in love with a beautiful princess, but a prince saves her by reciting poetry because goblins hate it.

A full-length animated adaptation of the book, directed by József Gémes, was released in 1992 in the United Kingdom, and in June 1994 in the United States. This Hungary/Wales/Japan co-production, created at Budapest's PannóniaFilm, Japan's NHK, and S4C and Siriol Productions in Great Britain, starred the voices of Joss Ackland, Claire Bloom, William Hootkins and Rik Mayall. The film's producer, Robin Lyons, also wrote the screenplay and voiced the Goblin King. However, it was not well received commercially nor critically upon its US release from Hemdale Film Corporation in summer 1994, reportedly grossing only $1.8 million domestically and receiving mainly negative reviews (compared to Disney's very successful The Lion King that was released during the same month in the United States).

The film's title is "De Prinses van het Zonnevolk" in Dutch (English: The Princess of the Sun-people), "Prinsessan og durtarnir" in Icelandic (The Princess and the Trolls), and "La princesse et la forêt magique" (The princess and the magic forest) in French.

Other adaptations 

The Princess and the Goblins is also a poem by Sylvia Plath (1932–1963).
Shirley Temple played Princess Irene in a production on an episode of her television show.  Although the plot follows the basic outline of Macdonald's story, it glosses over the darker elements and is played primarily as comedy.  Irene and Curdie are portrayed as young adults instead of children (with hints of a budding romance), and the goblins are forgiven their evil deeds and reform. 
It was a book in the "100 Classic Books" collection for the Nintendo DS.
Twyla Tharp used the story in the full-length ballet of the same title.  It was her first to incorporate children and was co-commissioned by Atlanta Ballet and Royal Winnipeg Ballet in 2012.

Legacy

The sequel to this book is The Princess and Curdie.

J. R. R. Tolkien's depictions of goblins within Tolkien's legendarium was heavily influenced by the goblins within The Princess and the Goblin. 
In C. S. Lewis' novel That Hideous Strength, Elwin Ransom says that he lives 'like the king in Curdie''', and later in the novel, Jane Studdock reads the 'Curdie books'.
G. K. Chesterton wrote of The Princess and the Goblin'':

References

External links

 
Public domain version of The Princess and the Goblin at Project Gutenberg

1870s children's books
1872 British novels
1872 fantasy novels
British fantasy novels
British novels adapted into films
Children's books set in subterranea
Fictional characters introduced in 1872
Fictional goblins
Fictional princesses
Fictional queens
Fictional Welsh people
Novels adapted into ballets
British novels adapted into television shows
Novels by George MacDonald
Scottish children's literature
Victorian novels
Books about princesses
19th-century British children's literature